The Southern Conference (SoCon) is a collegiate athletic conference affiliated with the National Collegiate Athletic Association (NCAA) Division I. Southern Conference football teams compete in the Football Championship Subdivision (formerly known as Division I-AA). Member institutions are located in the states of Alabama, Georgia, North Carolina, South Carolina, Tennessee, and Virginia.

Established in 1921, the Southern Conference ranks as the fifth-oldest major college athletic conference in the United States, and either the third- or fourth-oldest in continuous operation, depending on definitions. Among conferences currently in operation, the Big Ten (1896) and Missouri Valley (1907) are indisputably older. The Pac-12 Conference did not operate under its current charter until 1959, but claims the history of the Pacific Coast Conference, founded in 1915, as its own. The Southwest Conference (SWC) was founded in 1914, but ceased operation in 1996. The Big Eight Conference claimed the same history as the Missouri Valley from 1907 to 1928 during its existence; though it essentially merged with four SWC members to form the Big 12 Conference in 1996, the Big 12 does not claim the Big Eight's legacy. The Ivy League was formally organized in 1954 with athletic competition starting in 1955, but claims the history of the Eastern Intercollegiate Basketball League, which competed from 1901 to 1955, as its own.

The Southern Conference is considered one of the stronger football conferences in the Football Championship Subdivision and is considered a mid-major conference in basketball. The three-time Division I NCAA Football champion Appalachian State Mountaineers were a member of the conference when they stunned the fifth-ranked Michigan Wolverines 34–32 on September 1, 2007. The Davidson Wildcats reached the Elite Eight in the 2008 NCAA Men's Division I Basketball Tournament by upsetting power programs Gonzaga, Georgetown, and Wisconsin. More recently, the six-time Division I NCAA Football champion Georgia Southern Eagles stunned Southeastern Conference power-house Florida Gators 26–20 in The Swamp on November 23, 2013—the first loss to a lower division opponent in the Florida program's history. In 2015, Furman defeated UCF 16–15 and The Citadel topped South Carolina 23–22 for their second win over the Gamecocks in the past three meetings.  On September 4, 2021, East Tennessee State University stunned Vanderbilt 23–3 in their opening game.  The SoCon also frequently sees multiple teams selected to participate in the NCAA Division I Baseball Championship.

History

Talks of a new conference for Southern athletics had started as early as fall of 1920. The conference was formed on February 25, 1921 in Atlanta as fourteen member institutions split from the Southern Intercollegiate Athletic Association. Southern Conference charter members were Alabama, Auburn, Clemson, Georgia, Georgia Tech, Kentucky, Maryland, Mississippi State, North Carolina, North Carolina State,  Tennessee, Virginia, Virginia Tech, and Washington & Lee. In 1922, six more universities – Florida, LSU, Mississippi, South Carolina, Tulane, and Vanderbilt joined the conference. The first year of competition for the conference was in 1922, effective January 1. The new rules banned freshman play. Later additions included Sewanee (1924), Virginia Military Institute (1924), and Duke (1929).

The SoCon is particularly notable for having spawned two other major conferences. In 1932, the 13 schools located south and west of the Appalachians (Alabama, Auburn, Florida, Georgia, Georgia Tech, Kentucky, LSU, Mississippi, Mississippi State, University of the South (Sewanee), Tennessee, Tulane, and Vanderbilt) all departed the SoCon to form the Southeastern Conference (SEC).  In 1953, seven additional schools (Clemson, Duke, Maryland, North Carolina, North Carolina State, South Carolina, and Wake Forest) withdrew from the SoCon to form the Atlantic Coast Conference (ACC).  The SEC and ACC have gone on to surpass their parent conference in prestige; while the SEC and ACC are considered "power" conferences in Division I FBS (formerly Division I-A), the SoCon dropped to Division I-AA (FCS) in 1982, four years after the top division was split into two levels in 1978.

The SoCon became the first league to hold a post-season basketball tournament to decide a conference champion. Although first played in 1921, it did not become "official" until 1922, and in its first few years included teams which were not conference members. Held at the Municipal Auditorium in Atlanta from February 24 – March 2, 1922, the first meeting was won by North Carolina who defeated non-member Mercer in the Finals 40–25. The SoCon Basketball Tournament continues as the nation's oldest conference tournament. The next-oldest tournament overall is the SEC men's basketball tournament, founded in 1933, but that event was suspended after its 1952 edition and did not resume until 1979. With the demise of the Division II West Virginia Intercollegiate Athletic Conference in 2013, whose tournament had been continuously held since 1936, the next-oldest conference tournament in continuous existence is now the ACC men's basketball tournament, first held in 1954.

Member schools

Current members
The all-sports membership changed to 10 schools in 2014 following the departure of Appalachian State, Davidson, Elon, and Georgia Southern, plus the arrival of East Tennessee State (ETSU), Mercer, and VMI. The current football membership stands at nine. UNC Greensboro does not sponsor football, while ETSU relaunched its previously dormant football program in 2015 and rejoined SoCon football in 2016 after one season as an independent.

The 10 members of the Southern Conference are:

Notes

Associate members
On January 9, 2014, the SoCon and Atlantic Sun Conference, now known as the ASUN Conference, announced a new alliance in lacrosse that took effect with the 2015 spring season (2014–15 school year). Under its terms, sponsorship of men's lacrosse shifted from the ASUN to the SoCon, while women's lacrosse sponsorship remained with the ASUN. Bellarmine, which had announced it would join the ASUN for men's lacrosse for the 2015 spring season, instead joined the SoCon. The alliance remains in effect in men's lacrosse, but the leagues amicably ended their full alliance in women's lacrosse once the SoCon began sponsoring that sport in the 2018 spring season (2017–18 school year). However, the conferences maintained their working relationship in women's lacrosse, with the SoCon adding Coastal Carolina as an associate member effective with the 2021 spring season (2020–21 school year) in order to keep both conferences at five women's lacrosse members for 2021. Coastal was intended to play in SoCon women's lacrosse in the 2022 spring season (2021–22 school year) as well, but the SoCon decided to drop the sport after the 2021 spring season (2020–21 school year). While no formal announcement was made, the SoCon–ASUN women's lacrosse partnership definitively ended at that time, as the three full SoCon members who sponsored women's lacrosse moved that sport to the Big South Conference. Coastal and Delaware State both returned women's lacrosse to the ASUN Conference.

The men's lacrosse partnership took a slightly different form from the 2022 spring season (2021–22 school year) forward, as the ASUN reinstated its men's lacrosse league. The two full ASUN members with men's lacrosse programs separated, with Jacksonville remaining in SoCon men's lacrosse while Bellarmine joined the ASUN men's lacrosse league. SoCon associate Air Force also left for ASUN men's lacrosse. The SoCon maintained its automatic NCAA tournament berth with the addition of Hampton.

Before the addition of Hampton men's lacrosse, the most recent addition to the associate membership was Presbyterian wrestling, which joined during summer 2019. Two women's lacrosse members, Central Michigan and Detroit Mercy, left after the 2020 season (2019–20 school year) to join the new women's lacrosse league of Central's full-time home of the Mid-American Conference; this move contributed to the eventual demise of the SoCon women's lacrosse league.

Men's soccer member Belmont will leave the SoCon after the 2021–22 school year when it joins the Missouri Valley Conference, which sponsors that sport. At the same time, Hampton will move men's lacrosse to its new full-time home of the Colonial Athletic Association.

The addition of men's lacrosse by the Atlantic 10 Conference, announced on May 23, 2022, led to the demise of the SoCon men's lacrosse league after the 2022 season. In addition to Hampton joining the CAA, SoCon associate members High Point and Richmond (the latter a full A-10 member) moved to the A-10, and Jacksonville returned to ASUN men's lacrosse.

In the table below, the "Joined" column denotes the start of the school year in which the institution became an associate member, which for spring sports differs from the first season of competition.

Notes

Former members
Most former members are currently members of either the Southeastern Conference or the Atlantic Coast Conference.  Two of the former full members, Appalachian State and Davidson, maintain SoCon associate membership in wrestling. A third former full member, Georgia Southern, became an associate member in rifle when the SoCon added the sport for the 2016–17 school year.

Former associate members 
In the table below, the "Joined" and "Left" columns denotes the calendar year in which each school joined and left the SoCon. For fall sports, the year of departure differs from the final year of competition. For spring sports, the year of arrival differs from the first season of competition.

SoCon Membership timeline

   

 Due to space limitations, one portion of Washington and Lee's affiliation history is not indicated in the table. In 1958, W&L stopped awarding athletic scholarships; from then until 1962, it was an independent in what was then the NCAA College Division (which was split in 1973 to form today's Divisions II and III).

Sports

The Southern Conference sponsors championship competition in 11 men's, 9 women's, and one coeducational NCAA-sanctioned sports. Five schools are associate members for wrestling. Under a cooperative agreement with the ASUN Conference, the SoCon began sponsoring men's lacrosse in the 2014–15 school year (2015 season) with three full members (Furman, Mercer, VMI) and four associates (Bellarmine, High Point, Jacksonville, Richmond). SoCon men's lacrosse has since added Air Force. Women's lacrosse was sponsored by the ASUN through the 2017 season, after which the SoCon launched its own women's lacrosse league. Beginning in the 2016–17 academic year, after a 30-year hiatus, the SoCon resumed rifle as its 21st sport.  Members for conference competition are full members The Citadel, VMI, and Wofford as well as associate members UAB, Georgia Southern, and North Georgia.  The SoCon is one of only two all-sports conferences to sponsor rifle, joining the Ohio Valley Conference.  Rifle is technically a men's sport for NCAA purposes, but men's, women's, and coed teams all compete against each other. Women's lacrosse was added as the 22nd sport for 2017–18, but was dropped after the 2020–21 school year.

The SoCon dropped men's lacrosse after the 2022 season. Affiliate member Hampton joined the Colonial Athletic Association, which sponsors that sport, and the Atlantic 10 Conference, full-time home to men's lacrosse affiliate Richmond, launched a men's lacrosse league in the 2023 season, also taking in another SoCon affiliate in High Point. With SoCon men's lacrosse being gutted by these changes, VMI moved that sport to its former men's lacrosse home of the Metro Atlantic Athletic Conference, and the two remaining men's lacrosse members, Jacksonville and Mercer, moved that sport to the ASUN.

Men's sponsored sports by school

Notes

Men's varsity sports not sponsored by the Southern Conference which are played by SoCon schools:

Women's sponsored sports by school

Notes

Women's varsity sports not sponsored by the Southern Conference which are played by SoCon schools:

Facilities

Notes

Conference champions

Football

This is a partial list of the last 10 champions. For the full history, see List of Southern Conference football champions.

† Automatic bid to NCAA Division I Football Championship

Men's basketball
This is a partial list of the last 10 regular-season and tournament champions. For the full history, see List of Southern Conference men's basketball champions.

The Southern Conference split into a divisional format for basketball beginning with the 1994–95 season.

However, the divisional format was abandoned beginning with the 2013–14 season.

Women's basketball
This is a partial list of the last 10 tournament champions. For the full history, see Southern Conference women's basketball tournament

Baseball
This is a partial list of the last 10 champions. For the full history, see Southern Conference baseball tournament.

Rifle

Men's Lacrosse

Commissioner's and Germann Cups
The Commissioner's and Germann Cups are awarded each year to the top men's and women's program in the conference. The Commissioner's Cup was inaugurated in 1970. The Germann Cup, named for former Southern Conference Commissioner Ken Germann, was first awarded in 1987. The completion of the 2013–2014 athletics season saw Appalachian State winning its 33rd Commissioner's Cup and Furman its 13th Germann Cup.

See also
List of American collegiate athletic stadiums and arenas
Southern Conference Hall of Fame

References

External links

Relevant literature
Iamarino, John. 2020. A Proud History of Athletic History. Mercer University Press.

 
Spartanburg, South Carolina
Organizations based in South Carolina
Sports in the Southern United States
Sports organizations established in 1921
Articles which contain graphical timelines
College rifle conferences in the United States